Joaquín Nin y Castellanos (29 September 1879, Havana – 24 October 1949, Havana) was a Cuban pianist and composer. Nin was the father of Anaïs Nin.

Biography
He was son of the Catalan writer Joaquin Nin Tudó and Àngela Castellanos Perdomo, a Cuban from Camagüey. Nin studied piano with Moritz Moszkowski and composition at the Schola Cantorum (where he taught from 1906 to 1908). He toured as a pianist and was known as a composer and arranger of popular Spanish folk music. Nin was a member of the Real Academia de Bellas Artes de San Fernando of Madrid and the French Legion of Honor.

He was the father of Thorvald Nin, composer Joaquín Nin-Culmell, and writer Anaïs Nin with singer Rosa Culmell.

Joaquín Nin appears as one of the characters in the novel The Island of Eternal Love (Riverhead, 2008), by Cuban writer Daína Chaviano.

Memory 

In her memoirs and fiction, his daughter Anaïs Nin often attempts to consider aspects of her own nature by recalling how her father treated her as a child. Her "unexpurgated" diary volume Incest: From a Journal of Love describes an incestuous relationship with him in adulthood. She described him as an egotistical Don Juan and would often imitate him by affecting a "Doña Juana" persona.

References

External links

1879 births
1949 deaths
People from Havana
Cuban people of Catalan descent
Schola Cantorum de Paris alumni
Academic staff of the Schola Cantorum de Paris
Piano pedagogues
Spanish classical pianists
Male classical pianists
Spanish composers
Spanish male composers
Cuban classical pianists
Cuban composers
Male composers
Cuban people of French descent
Cuban male musicians